Merlyn Edwin Condit (March 21, 1917 – October 18, 1992), nicknamed "Merlyn the Magician," was an American football H-back in the National Football League for the Pittsburgh Steelers, the Washington Redskins, and the Brooklyn Dodgers.  He played college football at West Virginia University and Carnegie Mellon University.

Professional career
The Cleveland Rams selected Condit in the second round of the 1940 NFL Draft, but he never played for them, instead joining Pittsburgh as a rookie in 1940, where he earned a selection to the NFL All-Star Game.  Condit next played three seasons for the Brooklyn Dodgers between 1941 and 1943.  In 1942 Condit finished second in the league in rushing yards and total yards from scrimmage, and first in yards per carry.  He was named to his second All-Star Game and was voted 2nd team All-NFL by the AP, NFL, and NY Daily News.  

Condit also contributed to Brooklyn's defense and special teams.  He intercepted 10 passes for the Dodgers, kicked 5 field goals and 21 extra points, and served as punter and punt returner during his time with the club.

Condit served in World War II during parts of 1943 and 1944.  He returned to the NFL in 1945, playing that year for the Washington Redskins.  He finished his career with Pittsburgh in 1946.

References

1917 births
1992 deaths
Players of American football from Pennsylvania
American football halfbacks
American military personnel of World War II
Carnegie Mellon Tartans football players
Pittsburgh Steelers players
Brooklyn Dodgers (NFL) players
Washington Redskins players
West Virginia Mountaineers football players
Military personnel from Pennsylvania